Júlia Bartel Holgado (born 18 May 2004) is a Spanish footballer who plays as a midfielder for Barcelona.

Club career
Bartel as a junior has played for amateur clubs such as UE Castellbisbal and Sant Cugat FC before joining Espanyol's youth team. In 2019 she chose to sign with Barcelona when she was still 15 years old. After two years playing for youth and reserve teams of the club, she made her debut for the first team on 27 June 2021 against Eibar, replacing Vicky Losada who was playing her final game for the club, thus being 17 years and one month old, Bartel became the fourth youngest player to have ever played for the main team. On 16 April 2022, in what was only her third game (first time on the starting squad) and after having merely played a combined 66 minutes for the first team throughout her career, Bartel made an assist against Valencia for a goal scored by Aitana Bonmatí.

International career
Despite the COVID-19 pandemic delaying major youth national tournaments in 2020, Bartel has amassed extensive experience playing for many junior levels of Spain's national team.  She scored an impressive goal against Portugal on 9 April 2022, and was one of the key proponents for Spain to reach the final round of 2022 UEFA Championship, having appeared in all 6 games played by Spain throughout the qualification phase.

References

External links
 
 

2004 births
Living people
Footballers from Terrassa
Spanish women's footballers
Women's association football midfielders
Spain women's youth international footballers
Primera División (women) players
Sportswomen from Catalonia
Segunda Federación (women) players
FC Barcelona Femení B players
FC Barcelona Femení players
21st-century Spanish women